The 2021 Norfolk State Spartans football team represented Norfolk State University as a member of the Mid-Eastern Athletic Conference (MEAC) in the 2021 NCAA Division I FCS football season. The Spartans, led by first-year head coach Dawson Odums, played their home games at William "Dick" Price Stadium.

Schedule

References

Norfolk State
Norfolk State Spartans football seasons
Norfolk State Spartans football